Tylidae is a family of woodlice. It contains approximately 27 species, all but one in the genus Tylos, the other being Helleria brevicornis. Together with the family Ligiidae, Tylidae appears to have diverged early from the remaining woodlouse families.

References

Woodlice
Crustacean families